Nyborg (pronounced : Newbury) is a locality situated in Kalix Municipality, Norrbotten County, Sweden with 833 inhabitants in 2010. Their bandy club is called Nyborgs SK.

Nyborg was originally the name of a now disfunct saw mill, but has become used for the two villages Ytterbyn and Målsön which are so close together that they count as one locality.

References 

Populated places in Kalix Municipality
Norrbotten